Bitport, also known as Bitport.io, is a freemium browser-based cloud BitTorrent downloader providing users with the ability to stay anonymous.

Bitport allows downloading Torrent files without the need to use private internet connection. Seeding and leeching of files runs on the server side of the client. Users are then able to download files as a direct link download. This direct download is in the case of Bitport further encrypted using SSL providing a further layer of privacy protection.

It features File streaming, mass zip downloading, FTP access, CDN servers IDM support, antivirus check, and SSL encryption.

References

BitTorrent
Browsers